Zeng Yongquan (1902–1996) was a Chinese diplomat. He was born in Xindu District, Chengdu, Sichuan. He was a graduate of Beijing Foreign Studies University. He was Ambassador of People's Republic of China to Poland (1952–1955), East Germany (1955–1957) and Romania (March–October 1966). He was a vice-minister of the Ministry of Foreign Affairs of the People's Republic of China. He was a member of the Standing Committee of the Chinese People's Political Consultative Conference.

References

1902 births
1996 deaths
Beijing Foreign Studies University alumni
Ambassadors of China to Poland
Ambassadors of China to East Germany
Ambassadors of China to Romania
Vice-ministers of the Ministry of Foreign Affairs of the People's Republic of China
Members of the Standing Committee of the 5th Chinese People's Political Consultative Conference
Members of the Standing Committee of the 6th Chinese People's Political Consultative Conference
People's Republic of China politicians from Sichuan
Politicians from Chengdu